Aitor Kintana Zarate (born 15 July 1975 in Vitoria-Gasteiz) is a Spanish former cyclist.

Major results

2000
5th Overall Tour de l'Avenir
1st Stage 8
2001
2nd Overall Vuelta a La Rioja
2002
2nd Overall Route du Sud
7th Classique des Alpes
7th Overall Critérium du Dauphiné
2003
1st Stage 3 Volta a Catalunya

References

1975 births
Living people
Spanish male cyclists
Sportspeople from Vitoria-Gasteiz
Cyclists from the Basque Country (autonomous community)